The 1864 Grand National was the 26th renewal of the Grand National horse race that took place at Aintree near Liverpool, England, on 9 March 1864.
The winning mare was a full sister to the 1863 winner Emblem.

Finishing Order

Non-finishers

References

 1864
Grand National
Grand National
19th century in Lancashire
March 1864 sports events